The Chronicon Pictum or Illuminated Chronicle (Latin for "Illustrated Chronicle", English: Illuminated Chronicle or Vienna Illuminated Chronicle, also referred to as Chronica Hungarorum, Chronicon Hungarie Pictum, Chronica Picta or Chronica de Gestis Hungarorum) is a medieval illustrated chronicle from the Kingdom of Hungary from the 14th century. It represents the great international artistic style of the royal courts in the court of King Louis I of Hungary. The codex is a unique source of art, medieval and cultural history.

The chronicle's full name is: Chronicon pictum, Marci de Kalt, Chronica de gestis Hungarorum (Illustrated Chronicle, Mark of Kalt's Chronicle About the Deeds of the great Hungarians).

History of the chronicle 
The chronicle was written by Mark of Kalt in 1358 in Latin, with the last of the illuminations being finished between 1370 and 1373.

The chronicle was given by the great Hungarian king Louis I to the French king Charles V, when the daughter of Louis, Catherine, was engaged to Charles's son Louis I, Duke of Orléans in 1374. The chronicle was then given to Serbian despot Đurađ Branković as gift from the French king Charles VII. The chronicle was copied in 1462. Between 1458 and 1490, it was still in Hungary, in the court of King Matthias, and later lost, possibly spending some time in Turkish possession. There is evidence to suggest that in the second half of the 15th century the chronicle was in Hungary, it also contains several handwritten Hungarian and Latin entries from the 15th and 16th centuries, even in three places with Turkish writing in Hungarian. From the fact that it contains Turkish comments related to Hungary, the researchers concluded that between the end of the 15th century and the beginning of the 17th century, the codex was owned by a Hungarian who knew Turkish very well. The chronicle may have fled Vienna from the Ottoman occupation in the 16th century. From the 17th century, it belonged to the court library in Vienna. Sebastian Tengnagel mentions it in the manuscript catalog of the court library from 1608 to 1636. The chronicle reappears in the first half of the 17th century in royal archives of Vienna by unknown means, which is why it is also referred as the Vienna Illuminated Chronicle. As a result of the Venice Cultural Convention, the chronicle returned to Hungary in 1934. The manuscript is now kept in the National Széchényi Library in Budapest (Országos Széchényi Könyvtár, Budapest).

Illuminations 
The 147 pictures of the chronicle are an inexhaustible source of information on medieval Hungarian cultural history, costume and court life, they also represent the most important records extent of Hungarian painting in the 14th century. The artistic value of the miniatures is quite high, and the characters are drawn with detail and with a knowledge of anatomy. The chronicle contains 147 miniatures: 10 larger images, 29 images in the width of the column, 4 smaller images at the bottom of the page in a round medallion shape, 99 images enclosed in initials, and 5 initials without images. In addition, there are 82 ornaments at the margin.

The images are listed in the same order as their appearance in the chronicle.

See also 

 Gesta Hungarorum
 Gesta Hunnorum et Hungarorum
 Chronica Hungarorum
 Hunor and Magor
 Seven chieftains of the Magyars
 Turul
 Árpád dynasty
 Principality of Hungary
 Kingdom of Hungary (1000–1301)

References

External links

 

  – A more readable Latin text, with notes in Latin
  – Hungarian translation at the Hungarian Electronic Library

Hungarian chronicles
Hungarian books
History of Hungary
History of the Hungarians
Kingdom of Hungary
Medieval Kingdom of Hungary
9th century in Hungary
10th century in Hungary
11th century in Hungary
12th century in Hungary
13th century in Hungary
14th century in Hungary
14th-century illuminated manuscripts
14th-century history books
14th-century Latin books
Illuminated histories